Fraconalto (until 1927, Fiaccone) is a comune (municipality) in the Province of Alessandria in the Italian region Piedmont, located about  southeast of Turin and about  southeast of Alessandria and  from Genoa-Pontedecimo.

It is in the Ligurian Apennines, near the Bocchetta Pass in the upper Val Lemme. Nearby is the artificial Lake Busalletta.

See also 
 Parco naturale delle Capanne di Marcarolo

References

Cities and towns in Piedmont